Jorhat is one of the important cities and a growing urban centre in the state of Assam in India.

Etymology
Jorhat ("jor" means twin and "hat" means market) means two hats or mandis - "Masorhaat" and "Sowkihat" which existed on the opposite banks of the Bhugdoi river.

History 

Jorhat was the last capital of the Ahom Kingdom, as a planned town under royal patronage. It is often spelt as "Jorehaut" during the British reign. In 1794, the Ahom King Gaurinath Singha shifted the capital from Sivasagar, erstwhile Rangpur to Jorhat. Many tanks were built around the capital city by the Ahom royalty such as Rajmao Pukhuri or Borpukhuri, Buragohain Pukhuri, Bolia Gohain Pukhuri, Kotoki Pukhuri and Mitha Pukhuri. This town was a flourishing and commercial metropolis but was destroyed by a series of Burmese invasion of Assam between 1817 and the arrival of the British force in 1824 under the stewardship of David Scott and Captain Richard.

From the very first decade of the British rule, revolutionaries like Gomdhar Konwar,  Dhananjay Borgohain, Jeuram Dihingia Baruah , and Peuli Phukan emerged. The British system of administration came into vogue in the year 1839 with an established Police Thana. During the great Sepoy Mutiny, Maniram Dewan and Piyali Barua were publicly hanged here in 1858.

In 1885, a narrow-gauge railway, Jorehaut Provincial Railway, became operational. In time, this contributed to the rapid growth of the tea industry.

Geography 

The sex ratio is 913 (913 females per 1000 males).

Demographics 
Jorhat Municipal Board (covering the out growth area) had a population of 1,26,736 as of the 2011 census.

The average literacy rate of Jorhat in 2011 was 91.39%. Gender-wise, male and female literacy were 93.63% and 88.99% respectively, which is one of the highest in the state. The total literates in Jorhat were 182,600 of which male and female were 96,806 and 85,794 respectively.

Jorhat's sex ratio stood at 935 females per 1000 males, according to the Census 2011 Directorate.

Hindus were 87.49% of the population, while Muslims were 10.50% and Christians 0.62% of the population respectively.

Scheduled Castes and Scheduled Tribes are 6.40% and 1.84% of the population respectively.

Languages
Assamese is the predominant language and is spoken by 70.08% of the population, while Bengali was spoken by 12.27%. Hindi (11.60%) and Bhojpuri (1.01%) are spoken by migrants from the Gangetic plains, such as traders and labourers. Other small languages in the city include Marwari, Sadri, Santali, Sora and Odia which in total are spoken by 5.04% of the population.

Culture 
Jorhat has contributed in the fields of arts, culture and tradition of the contemporary Assamese society. In 1896, Jorhat Theatre was established to perform cultural activities and dramas by some renowned people of the town. The Chandrakanta Handique Bhawan, the headquarters of Asam Sahitya Sabha was established in 1926. Jorhat has produced creative writers, historians and journalists. Birendra Kumar Bhattacharya, the first Assamese to win India's highest literature award, the Jnanpith Award, was from Jorhat.

Media 
In 1935, the first Assamese daily newspaper Dainik Batori was published from Jorhat by Raibahadur Siva Prasad Barooah. The daily newspapers which have Jorhat editions include Dainik Janambhumi, Amar Asom, Dainik Agradoot and Asomiya Khabar in Assamese, the Purbanchal Prohori in Hindi and The Telegraph in English. The Eastern Clarion was the first English daily published from the city, but it was ceased. Besides the dailies, a weekly newspaper Saptahik Janambhumi is also published from Jorhat. City Guide of Jorhat was the first yellow pages, published in July 1987. Jorhat has a radio broadcast station of All India Radio (AIR) located on the outskirts of the city at Garmur.

District Court 

The District & Sessions Judge Upper Assam District Jorhat was created on 15 November 1948 and has been made permanent w.e.f the 1 April 1953. The first roll of honor of District & Sessions Judge of Assam Valley, Upper Assam Districts, Jorhat District was Mr. S.K Das, MA, BL. Presently, the territorial jurisdiction of the District is extended over 2(two) sub-divisions namely Majuli Sub-Division and Titabar Sub-Division. Altogether, the District & Sessions Judge and the Chief Judicial Magistrate comprise 15 courts staffed by Judicial Officers of various grades. The District & Sessions Judge together with the Chief Judicial Magistrate Court Complex, Jorhat is situated in the heart of the city. The Present District & Sessions Judge as the head of the establishment is Shri Mridul Kumar Kalita. The present Chief Judicial Magistrate, Jorhat, the head of all the Criminal Courts is Sri Vijay Kumar Singh.

Transport

Air 
The airport has daily flights connectivity operated by IndiGo to Kolkata, New Delhi and Guwahati. It is controlled by the Airports Authority of India.

Rail 
The first rail connectivity of Jorhat began in the British era. In 1885, Jorehaut Provincial Railway, a narrow-gauge railway services became operational and it contributed to the growth of the tea industry in Upper Assam.

Jorhat is served by Jorhat Town railway station which lies on the Furkating-Jorhat-Mariani branch line of Tinsukia railway division. It falls in the Lumding-Dibrugarh section and is well connected to all the large cities of the country by long-distance express trains.

Road 
It provides connectivity to elsewhere in the state and the Northeast with regular buses from ASTC and private operators. Auto-rickshaws, local cabs and rickshaws are the main mode of public transport within the city.

Waterways 
The daily ferry services connect the Nimati ghat with Kamalabari and Aphalamukh in Majuli.
The Neamati multimodal waterways terminal on Brahmaputra National Waterway 2 in Jorhat district is part of the Bharatmala and Sagarmala projects.

Education and research institutions

Research institutes 

 Central Eri & Muga Research Training Institute, Ladoigarh, under Central Silk Board
 Indian Grain Storage Management and Research Institute, Jorhat
 Institute of Biotechnology & Geotectonics Studies (INBIGS), ONGC Complex, Cinnamara, Jorhat - 785008
 North East Institute of Science and Technology, Jorhat (N.E.I.S.T.) (formerly R.R.L., Jorhat) under CSIR, Dept. of Science & Technology, Govt. of India
 Rain Forest Research Institute (R.F.R.I.), Jorhat under I.C.F.R.E., Min. of Environment & Forests, Govt.of India
 Tocklai Tea Research Institute, Tea Research Association (T.R.A.) Tocklai under Tea Research Association, Ministry of Commerce, Govt. of India
 College of Sericulture, under Assam Agriculture University

Universities 

 Assam Agricultural University (A.A.U.), under Government of Assam
 Assam Women's University, under Government of Assam
 Kaziranga University

Technical institutes 
 HRH The Prince of Wales Institute of Engineering and Technology
 Jorhat Engineering College, Directorate of Technical Education, Government of Assam
 Jorhat Institute of Science & Technology, formerly Science College, Jorhat, Government of Assam
 Kaziranga University, Mohbondha, Jorhat
 North East Institute of Management Science, (opposite the N.E.I.S.T.), Jorhat

Design institute 
 National Institute of Design, Jorhat

Medical institutes 
 Jorhat Medical College and Hospital under the State Government of Assam
 Medical Institute Jorhat, under the Government of Assam.
 Dr. J.K. Saikia Homeopathic Medical College & Hospital, Jorhat

Training institute
Institute of Advanced Studies in Education, Jorhat

Colleges 

 Bahona College
 CKB Commerce College
 D.C.B. Girls College
 Jagannath Barooah College
 Jorhat College
 Jorhat Institute of Science & Technology (formerly Jorhat Science College).
 Jorhat Kendriya Mahavidyalaya
 Jorhat Law College, M.G. Road, Jorhat
 Kakojan College, Kakojan
 Dr. Nobin Bordoloi College, Dhekiajuli
Cinnamara College, Cinnamara

Junior Colleges 
 Luit Valley Academy 
 NKEM Science Academy Junior College

Schools 
 Balya Bhavan, Jorhat
 Carmel Convent School, Cinnamara
 Delhi Public School, Jorhat, Sarucharai Gharfalia
 Dipankar Vidyapith
 Don Bosco High School, Baghchung
 Jawahar Navodaya Vidyalaya, Jorhat
 Jonaki Sangha Vidyalay, Jorhat
 Jorhat Govt. Boys' H.S and M.P. School
 Sankardev Seminary High School
 Shemford Futuristic School, Choladhara
 Spring Dale High School
 St. Mary's High School, Jorhat, Rowriah
 Kendriya Vidyalaya (Indian Air Force Station), Jorhat-785005
 Kendriya Vidyalaya, NEIST (RRL), Jorhat-785006
 Kendriya Vidyalaya, (ONGC), Cinnamara

Sports 
Established in 1950, the multi-purpose Jorhat Stadium is the oldest stadium of Assam, which is mainly used for cricket and football.
It has hosted few Ranji Trophy matches. The historic football tournament ATPA Shield held every year in this venue since 1955. Professional football club Jorhat Town Club uses the stadium as their home ground. Facilities of other sports like badminton, tennis, swimming etc are also available near the stadium.

Politics 
Jorhat is part of Jorhat (Lok Sabha constituency).
Bharatiya Janata Party's Topon Kumar Gogoi the current Member of Parliament serving the 17th Lok Sabha from Jorhat, Assam. While Hitendra Nath Goswami of BJP is the incumbent MLA from Jorhat assembly constituency.

Notable people 
 Krishna Kanta Handique, Sanskrit scholar, Indologist and philanthropist
 Amulya Barua, Assamese poet
 Ananda Chandra Barua, Assamese poet, dramatist, former president of Asam Sahitya Sabha
 Ananda Chandra Dutta, Botanist
 Birendra Kumar Bhattacharya, The first Jnanpith Award-winning Assamese writer
 Ganesh Gogoi, Assamese poet
 Hiren Bhattacharyya, Assamese poet
 Hemendra Prasad Barooah, Tea planter and industrialist
 Tarun Gogoi, former Chief Minister of Assam.
 Jadav Payeng, The "Forest Man of India"
 Jagannath Barooah, Scholar, tea planter, philanthropist
 Jitendra Nath Goswami, Chief scientist of Chandrayaan -1
 Ranjit Barthakur, Businessman and chairman of Rajasthan Royals
 Anuradha Sharma Pujari, Assamese journalist and author
 Zubeen Garg, Assamese and Bollywood singer
 Joi Barua, Assamese and Bollywood singer
 Bijoy Krishna Handique, Former Union Minister
 Hitendra Nath Goswami, Former Speaker of Assam Legislative Assembly, MLA of Jorhat
 Akhil Gogoi, Prominent social activist, MLA from Sivasagar
 Prastuti Parashar, Assamese film actress
 Jayanta Nath, Singer, Composer, Music Director
 Anwara Taimur, First Woman Chief Minister of Assam
 Pitambar Deva Goswami, Spiritual leader, Prominent social worker
 Bijoya Chakravarty, Former Lok Sabha MP from Guwahati (Born in Jorhat)
 Gaurav Gogoi, Lok Sabha MP from Kaliabor
 Wasbir Hussain, Journalist

See also 
 Jorhat Municipal Board
 Jorehaut Provincial Railway
 Jorhat Stadium
 Jorhat Gymkhana Club
 Timeline of Jorhat

References

External links 

 Jorhat NIC
 Shree Digamber Jain Samaj Jorhat
 Jorhat census 2011

 
Former capital cities in India
Cities and towns in Jorhat district